Calostilbella is a genus of ascomycete fungi in the family Nectriaceae. It is a monotypic genus containing the sole species Calostilbella calostilbe.

External links
 

Nectriaceae genera

Monotypic Sordariomycetes genera